Istiaia-Aidipsos is a municipality in the Euboea regional unit, Central Greece, Greece. The seat of the municipality is the town Istiaia. The municipality has an area of 509.204 km2.

Municipality
The municipality Istiaia-Aidipsos was formed at the 2011 local government reform by the merger of the following 5 former municipalities, that became municipal units:
Aidipsos
Artemisio
Istiaia
Lichada
Oreoi

Province
The province of Istiaia was one of the provinces of the Euboea Prefecture. It had the same territory as the present municipality Istiaia-Aidipsos. It was abolished in 2006.

References

Municipalities of Central Greece
Provinces of Greece
Populated places in Euboea